Federico Luisetti is an Italian philosopher, he is Associate professor of Italian Culture and Society at the University of St. Gallen. From 2005 to 2017 he taught Italian Studies at the University of North Carolina, Chapel Hill where he has been the chair of the Department of Romance studies from 2014 to 2017. He is the author of books and essays on philosophy, literature, visual studies, the Avant-gardes, and political thought. He has also worked on decolonial thought and anthropology.

Publications 

The Anomie of the Earth: Philosophy, Politics, and Autonomy in Europe and the Americas, Federico Luisetti, John Pickles, Wilson Kaiser, editors, Duke University Press, 2015
Una vita. Pensiero selvaggio e filosofia dell’intensità, Mimesis, 2011.
A Century of Futurism: 1909–2009, Federico Luisetti and Luca Somigli, editors, “Annali d’Italianistica,” 27, 2009
Estetica dell’immanenza. Saggi sulle parole, le immagini e le macchine, Aracne, 2008. In Italian
Dopo il museo, Federico Luisetti and Giorgio Maragliano, editors, Trauben, 2006. In Italian
Plus Ultra. Enciclopedismo barocco e modernità, Trauben, 2001. In Italian
Museo, Federico Luisetti and Giorgio Maragliano, editors, a special issue of "Rivista di Estetica," ns 16, 1/2001. In Italian

References

External links
 Federico Luisetti's page at University of St. Gallen
 Federico Luisetti's page at UNC Romance Studies 
 Federico Luisetti's page on Academia.edu

Year of birth missing (living people)
Living people
Italian philosophers
University of North Carolina at Chapel Hill faculty